Medjay (also Medjai, Mazoi, Madjai, Mejay, Egyptian mḏꜣ.j, a nisba of mḏꜣ,) was a demonym used in various ways throughout ancient Egyptian history to refer initially to a nomadic group from Nubia and later as a generic term for desert-ranger police.

Origins

In the archaeological record, a culture known as the Pan-Grave Culture is generally considered by experts to represent the Medjay. This culture is named for its distinctive circular graves, found throughout Lower Nubia and Upper Egypt, which date to the late Middle Kingdom and Second Intermediate Period (1800-1550 BC). The sudden appearance of these graves in the Nile Valley suggests that they represent an immigrant population, while the presence of Nerita shells in many of them suggests their occupants came from the Eastern Desert between the Nile and the Red Sea. Other objects commonly found in these graves include the painted skulls of various horned animals, which are found either arranged in a circle around the burial pit or placed in separate offering pits.

The first mention of the Medjay in written records dates back to the Old Kingdom, when they were listed among other Nubian peoples in the Autobiography of Weni, who was at the time a general serving under Pepi I Meryre (reigned 2332–2287 BC). During this time the term "Medjay" referred to people from the land of Medja, a district thought to be located just east of the Second Nile Cataract in Nubia. Nubia was referred to as Ta-Seti, meaning "Land of the bow", by the Egyptians and the people there (including the Medjay) were renown for their military skills, particularly as archers. A decree from Pepi I's reign, which lists different officials (including an Overseer of the Medja, Irtjet and Satju), illustrates that Medja was at least to some extent subjugated by the Egyptian government. Since the time of Alan Gardiner, a common account has been that the Medjay constituted an ethnic group. More recent work suggests that the term was initially an Egyptian exonym, and that those identified as Medjay may not have considered themselves to have a shared ethnicity, and certainly were not a unified polity.

Written accounts from the Middle Kingdom such as the Semna Despatches describe the Medjay as nomadic desert people. Egyptian sources are inconsistent in distinguishing between "Nehesy" people generally and Medjay until the latter portion of the Middle Kingdom. Senwosret III enacted a prohibition on Nehesy movement north of Semna, while the administration began making a distinction between these two categories of people. Liszka hypothesizes that this may have motivated people to take on "Medjay" as an ethnic identity.

They also were sometimes employed as soldiers (as we know from the stele of Res and Ptahwer). And during the Second Intermediate Period, they were even used during Kamose's campaign against the Hyksos and became instrumental in making the Egyptian state into a military power. The Medjay were also hired as soldiers and guards in the Kushite military as well as the Roman Egypt army.

Police force

By the Eighteenth Dynasty during the New Kingdom, the Medjay were an elite paramilitary police force. No longer did the term refer to an ethnic group, and over time the new meaning became synonymous with policing in general. As an elite force, the Medjay were often used to protect valuable areas, especially areas of pharaonic interest like capital cities, royal cemeteries, and the borders of Egypt. Though they are best known for their protection of the royal palaces and tombs in Thebes and the surrounding areas, the Medjay were used throughout Upper and Lower Egypt. Each regional unit had its own captains. Chiefs of the Medjay are also known from the New Kingdom, but that title is more likely to refer to a person in charge of building and building material procurement.

At first, the group just consisted of ethnic Medjay and those descended from that ancient tribal group. This changed over time as more and more Egyptians took up their occupation. Records show that various Medjay chiefs and captains had Egyptian names and were depicted as such. Why this change occurred is not known, but it is assumed that, because of the Medjay's elite status, Egyptians joined them.

Demise
After the 20th Dynasty, the term Medjay is no longer found in Egyptian records. It is unknown whether the Medjay as an occupation had been abolished or the name of the force had changed. However, there is speculation that a group of people called the Meded who fought against the Kush during the 5th and 4th centuries B.C. might have been related to the Medjay.

Language
Linguistic evidence indicates that the Medjay spoke an ancient Cushitic language related to the Cushitic Beja language and that the Blemmyes were a subdivision of the Medjay. Rilly (2019) mentions historical records of a powerful Cushitic speaking group which controlled Lower Nubia and some cities in Upper Egypt. Rilly (2019) states:
The Blemmyes are another Cushitic speaking tribe, or more likely a subdivision of the Medjay/Beja people, which is attested in Napatan and Egyptian texts from the 6th century BC on.

On page 134:
From the end of the 4th century until the 6th century AD, they held parts of Lower Nubia and some cities of Upper Egypt.

He mentions the linguistic relationship between the modern Beja language and the ancient Cushitic Blemmyan language which dominated Lower Nubia and that the Blemmyes can be regarded as a particular tribe of the Medjay:
The Blemmyan language is so close to modern Beja that it is probably nothing else than an early dialect of the same language. In this case, the Blemmyes can be regarded as a particular tribe of the Medjay.

Cultural depictions
In the 1932 film The Mummy, the Medjay are mentioned as Pharaoh Seti I's personal bodyguards in ancient Egypt. They also feature in the 1999 remake The Mummy, and the sequel The Mummy Returns (2001).

In the 2017 video game Assassin's Creed Origins, the protagonist, Bayek of Siwa, is considered "the last Medjay".
In the game, the Medjay are depicted as a police force whose job is to protect the pharaoh. However, Bayek abandons his duty when he learns that the pharaoh Ptolemy XIII is an ally to a dark and mysterious organization called "The Order of the Ancients" 
which is responsible for the death of his son.

In the 2020 graphic novel 20s A Difficult Age: The Blue Madjai, by Marcus Orelias, the protagonist of the series goes by the moniker "the Blue Madjai".

In the 2017 video game For Honor, in the July 2022 "Curse of the Scarab: Title Update 2" software update, a playable character named for and inspired by the Medjay was released.

In the 2021 video game Forewarned, 1-4 players explore ancient Egyptian tombs and gather evidence to identify the evil Medjai haunting the area, and can perform elaborate hidden rituals to banish them to the Egyptian afterlife. In this game, Medjay, or Medjai are depicted as malevolent undead spirits.

See also
 Equites

References

Bibliography

24th-century BC establishments
11th-century BC disestablishments
Ancient Egyptian society
Blemmyes
Foreign contacts of ancient Egypt
History of Nubia
Law enforcement in Egypt
Military history of ancient Egypt
Paramilitary organisations based in Egypt
Combat occupations